Mathematical Methods of Classical Mechanics is a classic graduate textbook by the mathematician Vladimir I. Arnold. It was originally written in Russian, but was translated into English by A. Weinstein and K. Vogtmann.

Contents 
 Part I: Newtonian Mechanics
 Chapter 1: Experimental Facts
 Chapter 2: Investigation of the Equations of Motion
 Part II: Lagrangian Mechanics
 Chapter 3: Variational Principles
 Chapter 4: Lagrangian Mechanics on Manifolds
 Chapter 5: Oscillations
 Chapter 6: Rigid Bodies
 Part III: Hamiltonian Mechanics
 Chapter 7: Differential forms
 Chapter 8: Symplectic Manifolds
 Chapter 9: Canonical Formalism
 Chapter 10: Introduction to Perturbation Theory
 Appendices
 Riemannian curvature
 Geodesics of left-invariant metrics on Lie groups and the hydrodynamics of ideal fluids
 Symplectic structures on algebraic manifolds
 Contact structures
 Dynamical systems with symmetries
 Normal forms of quadratic Hamiltonians
 Normal forms of Hamiltonian systems near stationary points and closed trajectories
 Theory of perturbations of conditionally period motion and Kolmogorov's theorem
 Poincaré's geometric theorem, its generalizations and applications
 Multiplicities of characteristic frequencies, and ellipsoids depending on parameters
 Short wave asymptotics
 Lagrangian singularities
 The Kortweg-de Vries equation
 Poisson structures
 On elliptic coordinates
 Singularities of ray systems

Russian original and translations
The original Russian first edition Математические методы классической механики was published in 1974 by Наука, a second one was published in 1979, and a third - in 1989.
The first French translation, Les Méthodes mathématiques de la mécanique classique, was published in 1976.
The first Bulgarian translation, Математически методи на класическата механика, was published in 1978. А second translation of the second Russian edition appeared in 1985.
The first Japanese translation, 古典力学の数学的方法, was published in 1980. А second translation was published in 2003
The first Romanian translation, Metodele matematice ale mecanicii clasice, was published in 1980.
The first Polish translation, "Metody matematyczne mechaniki klasycznej", was published in 1981.
The first Spanish translation, Mecánica clásica. Métodos matemáticos, was published in 1983.
The first Hungarian translation, A mechanika matematikai módszerei, was published in 1985. А second translation appeared in 2013.
The first Portuguese translation, Métodos matemáticos da mecânica clássica, was published in 1987.
The first German translation, Mathematische Methoden der klassischen Mechanik, was published in 1988.
The first Italian translation, Metodi matematici della meccanica classica, was published in 1992. 
The first Chinese translation, 经典力学的数学方法, was published in 1992.

Reviews 
The Bulletin of the American Mathematical Society said, "The [book] under review [...] written by a distinguished mathematician [...is one of] the first textbooks [to] successfully to present to students of mathematics and physics, [sic] classical mechanics in a modern setting."

A book review in the journal Celestial Mechanics said, "In summary, the author has succeeded in producing a mathematical synthesis of the science of dynamics. The book is well presented and beautifully translated [...] Arnold's book is pure poetry; one does not simply read it, one enjoys it."

See also 

 List of textbooks in classical and quantum mechanics

References

Bibliography 

  

1974 non-fiction books
Classical mechanics
Graduate Texts in Mathematics
Physics textbooks